The Manhattan Bridge is a suspension bridge that crosses the East River in New York City, connecting Lower Manhattan at Canal Street with Downtown Brooklyn at the Flatbush Avenue Extension. It is one of four toll-free vehicular bridges connecting Manhattan Island to Long Island; the nearby Brooklyn Bridge is just slightly further downtown, while the Queensboro and Williamsburg bridges are to the north.

The bridge was designed by Leon Moisseiff, built by The Phoenix Bridge Company, and opened to traffic on December 31, 1909. An innovative design, it was the first suspension bridge to employ Josef Melan's deflection theory for deck stiffening, resulting in the first use of a lightly-webbed weight-saving Warren truss for its construction. Considered the forerunner of modern suspension bridges, it served as the model for many of the record-breaking spans built in the first half of the twentieth century.

History
The bridge was the last of the three suspension spans built across the lower East River, following the Brooklyn and Williamsburg Bridges. In the earliest plans it was to have been called "Bridge No. 3", but was given the name Manhattan Bridge in 1902. When the name was confirmed in 1904, The New York Times criticized it as "meaningless", lobbied for one after Brooklyn's Wallabout Bay, and railed that the span "would have geographical and historical significance if it were known as the Wallabout Bridge". In 1905, the Times renewed its campaign, stating, "All bridges across the East River are Manhattan bridges. When there was only one, it was well enough to call it the Brooklyn Bridge, or the East River Bridge".

Planning and construction

Planning and initial work 
The earliest plans for what became the Manhattan Bridge were designed by R. S. Buck. These plans called for a suspension bridge with carbon steel wire cables and a suspended stiffening truss, supported by a pair of towers with eight braced legs. Construction on the foundations for the suspension towers had commenced by at least 1901. A plan for the suspension bridge was announced in 1903. Elevated and trolley routes would use the Manhattan Bridge, and there would be large balconies and enormous spaces within the towers' anchorages. By 1903, three workers had died while working on the Brooklyn-side tower's caisson. A $10 million grant for the bridge's construction was granted in May 1904 with the expectation that work on the bridge would start later that year.

The Municipal Art Commission raised objections to one of the bridge's plans in June 1904, which delayed the start of construction for the span. Another set of plans was unveiled that month by New York City Bridge Commissioner Gustav Lindenthal, in conjunction with Henry Hornbostel. The proposal also called for each of the suspension towers to be made of four columns, to be braced transversely and hinged to the bottom of the abutments longitudinally. The same span dimensions from Buck's plan were used because work on the masonry pier foundations had already begun.  Additionally, the towers would have contained Modern French detail, while the anchorages would have been used for functions such as meeting halls.

Lindenthal's plan was also rejected, over a dispute which revolved around whether his plan using eyebars was better than the more established practice of using wire cables. The MAC voted to use wire cables in the bridge in September 1904. Lindenthal was ultimately dismissed and a new design was commissioned from Leon Moisseiff. Lindenthal was also replaced by George Best as bridge commissioner. Hornbostel was replaced by Carrère and Hastings as architectural consultants. Because of this dispute, the plans for Manhattan Bridge are sometimes mistakenly attributed to Lindenthal. Other delays arose over the proposed placement of the bridge's termini on either side.

Subsequent construction 

The first temporary wire between the Manhattan Bridge's two towers was strung in June 1908. By this time, the construction cost had increased to $22 million. During the stringing of the anchorages, one of the cables on the Brooklyn side broke loose, injuring two people. The last of the suspender ropes supporting the main cables was strung in December of that year. The cables had been strung in four months, The construction of the bridge span required 30,000 tons of steel. Erection of the superstructure and steel fabrication were contracted to The Phoenix Bridge Company. The first girder for the new bridge was installed in February 1909. By April, the majority of the span had been fitted into place between the main cables.

The New York City Rapid Transit Commission recommended the construction of a subway line across the Manhattan Bridge in 1905. This line was approved in 1907. The New York City Public Service Commission requested permission to start constructing the subway tracks in March 1908. This plan was approved in May.

Opening and early history 
A group of 100 "leading citizens of Brooklyn" walked over the bridge on December 5, 1909, marking the unofficial completion of the bridge. The bridge was officially opened by outgoing Mayor George B. McClellan Jr. on December 31, 1909. Shortly after opening, a fire on the Brooklyn side of the Manhattan Bridge damaged the structure.

In 1910, the year after the bridge opened, Carrère and Hastings drew up preliminary plans for an elaborate Beaux Arts grand entry to the bridge on the Manhattan side as part of the "City Beautiful" movement (see ), as well as a smaller approach on the Brooklyn side. These approaches would hide the bridge. The final plans were approved in 1912, and construction began the same year. The arch and colonnade were completed in 1915, while a pair of pylons on the Brooklyn side were installed in November 1916.

An upper-deck roadway on the bridge was installed in 1922. The bridge was the subject of American artist Edward Hopper's 1928 painting Manhattan Bridge Loop.

Floodlights and barbed-wire fences were installed at the bases of the bridge's anchorages in 1951, during the Cold War. The installations were fortified to protect against "possible sabotage attempts under wartime conditions". The anchorages themselves were sealed. The pylons on the Brooklyn side were removed in 1963 to accommodate a widened roadway, and they were moved to the Brooklyn Museum.

Reconstruction 
The subway trains crossing the Manhattan Bridge had a major impact on its condition (see ), and the bridge started to tilt to one side based on how many trains used that side. This had supposedly been a problem since the tracks opened in 1917. In 1956, the bridge was renovated in order to rectify this tilt. However, by 1978, the Manhattan Bridge had deteriorated to such a point that the United States Congress voted to allocate money to repair the bridge, as well as several others in New York City. Minor repair work started in 1982. A discretionary grant for $50 million was allocated to these bridges' repairs in 1985. The first phase of repairs started that year. The bridge's condition was blamed on the imbalance in the number of trains crossing the bridge, as well as deferred maintenance during the New York City fiscal crisis of the 1970s.

In April 1986, there was a temporary closure of the Manhattan-bound roadway on the upper level in order to repair the deck. The north-side subway tracks, underneath the Manhattan-bound roadway, were also closed during this time. In December 1987, inspectors also shut one lane of the lower level due to a crack in the deck. The New York City Department of Transportation published a list of 17 structurally deficient bridges in the city. Among them was the Manhattan Bridge, which needed $166 million in repairs to fix "cable anchors and torsion of steel members as subways cross". Repairs on the northern side of the Manhattan Bridge were complete by the end of 1988, and the subway tracks on the north side were reopened. Simultaneous with the reopening of the north side, the south-side tracks were closed. In 1991, trucks were banned from the lower level because they were too heavy for the decaying bridge.

Major repair work on the southern side began in 1992. The Yonkers Construction Company was awarded a $97.8 million contract for the repair project in August 1992. City Comptroller Elizabeth Holtzman originally denied the contract to the company because of concerns about corruption, but she was overridden by Mayor David Dinkins, who wanted to complete repairs quickly. At the same time, the NYCDOT increased the frequency of maintenance inspections for the bridge, after inspectors found holes in beams that had been deemed structurally sound during previous inspections. The Brooklyn-bound roadway on the upper level was closed from 1993 to 1996 so that side of the bridge could be repaired. The bridge repairs were repeatedly delayed as the renovation process uncovered more serious structural problems underlying the bridge. The original plans had been to complete the renovations by 1995 for $150 million, but by 1996, the renovation was slated to be complete in 2003 at a cost of $452 million. By 2001, it was estimated that the total cost of the renovations had reached $500 million, including $260 million for the south side and another $175 million for the north side. At the time, the NYCDOT had set a January 2004 deadline for the renovation.

The arch and colonnade had also become deteriorated, having become covered with graffiti and dirt. The enclosed plaza within the colonnade had been used as a parking lot by the New York City Police Department, while the only remaining portion of the large park surrounding the arch and colonnade, at Canal and Forsyth Streets, had accumulated trees. The arch and colonnade themselves had open joints in the stonework, as well as weeds, bushes, and small trees growing at their top. The arch and colonnade were restored starting in the late 1990s, with the restoration being completed in April 2001 for $11 million. The project entailed cleaning the structures and installing 258 floodlights.

21st century 

The original pedestrian walkway on the south side of the bridge was reopened after 40 years in June 2001. It was shared with bicycles until late summer 2004, when a dedicated bicycle path was opened on the north side of the bridge. The northern bridge bike path is notable for poor signage that leads to cyclist and pedestrian conflicts. By the time work on the bridge was completed in 2004, the final cost of the renovation totaled $800 million. The lower-level roadway was then renovated between 2004 and 2008.

To celebrate the bridge's centennial, a series of events and exhibits were organized by the New York City Bridge Centennial Commission in October 2009. These included a ceremonial parade across the Manhattan Bridge on the morning of October 4 and a fireworks display in the evening. In 2009, the bridge was designated as a National Historic Civil Engineering Landmark by the American Society of Civil Engineers.

An $834 million project to replace the Manhattan Bridge's suspension cable was announced in 2010. The work was scheduled to take two years. In late 2018, after rubble was found in Brooklyn Bridge Park under the Brooklyn approach, Skanska was given a contract to repair parts of the bridge at a cost of $75.9 million. The renovation was scheduled to finish in early 2021. The work entailed replacing some fencing, installing some new steel beams on the spans, and refurbishing ornamental elements on the towers. For instance, the spherical finials atop the suspension towers were replaced with cast-iron copies.

Description 

The Manhattan Bridge has four vehicle lanes on the upper level, split between two roadways carrying opposite directions of traffic.  The lower level has three Manhattan-bound vehicle lanes (formerly reversible), four subway tracks, two under each of the upper roadways; a walkway on the west; and a bikeway on the east. The bridge once carried New York State Route 27 and later was planned to carry Interstate 478.

Both of the steel suspension towers contain little decorative detail, except for spherical finials, and rest on masonry piers. Each suspension tower contains an iron and copper hood over the pedestrian or bike path on either side, as well as iron cornices just below the tops of the towers. The Manhattan Bridge contains four main cables, which descend from the tops of the suspension towers and help support the deck. The anchorages were made wider than the main or approach spans to give pedestrians a place to rest. Each anchorage is designed with a colonnade on either side, beneath which is a large arch. These are the only portions of the anchorage that are decorated.

Approach plazas
Carrère and Hastings designed approach plazas on both ends of the bridge. At the time of the bridge's opening, these plazas were meant to conceal views of the Manhattan Bridge from the streets on either end.

Arch and colonnade

The arch and colonnade on the Manhattan end of the bridge were completed in 1915. They surround an elliptical plaza facing northwest toward the Bowery. The arch and colonnade are made of white, fine-grained Hallowell granite. They are decorated with two groups of allegorical sculptures by Carl Augustus Heber and a frieze called "Buffalo Hunt" by Charles Cary Rumsey. The design of the arch and colonnade reference the fact that the Manhattan Bridge continues into Brooklyn as Flatbush Avenue, which runs south to the Atlantic Ocean. The arch thus signified the Manhattan Bridge's role as an ocean "gateway". The plaza was influenced by the New York Improvement Plan of 1907, which sought to create plazas and other open spaces at large intersections; a massive circular plaza, connecting the Brooklyn and Manhattan Bridges, was never built. 

The arch was based on Paris's Porte Saint-Denis. It is one of the city's three remaining triumphal arches, the others being the Washington Square Arch and the Soldiers' and Sailors' Arch. On the northern side of the arch, the opening is flanked by carvings of classical ships, masks, shields, and oak leaves. The western pier contains the sculptural group Spirit of Commerce, depicting a winged woman flanked by two figures. The eastern pier contains Spirit of Industry, depicting the god Mercury flanked by two figures. The arch's keystone contains a depiction of a bison. Above is the "Buffalo Hunt" frieze, which depicts Native Americans hunting animals while on horseback. The relief is topped by dentils and egg-and-dart ornamentation. The cornice of the arch contains modillions as well as six lion heads. The interior of the arch contains a coffered ceiling. There are rosettes on the arch's soffit. The southern side of the arch, facing Brooklyn, is less ornately decorated but has rusticated stone blocks indicative of a Parisian or Florentine bank. On the southern side, there are decorations of carved lions at the bases of each pier.

The colonnade and plaza was modeled after the one surrounding St. Peter's Square in Vatican City. It is supported by six pairs of  Tuscan columns on either side, with each pair of columns flanking rusticated piers inside the colonnade. Above each column is a stone with a classical motif, such as a boat or a cuirass. There is an entablature above the columns, as well as a cornice and balustrade at the top of the colonnade. The entablature contains roundels with floral motifs. The arch and colonnade were initially surrounded by granite retaining walls that contained decorative balustrades surrounding parkland on either side of the arch and colonnade. Only a small segment of parkland remains at Canal and Forsyth Streets, while the south side of the park became Confucius Plaza.

American Architect and Architecture described the arch and colonnade in 1912 as "worthy of one of the principal gateways of a great modern city". The arch and colonnade were described as a "complete, dignified and monumental ensemble, worthy of one of the principal gateways of a great modern city" in a New York Times article. The Brooklyn Daily Eagle wrote: "The Manhattan Bridge will he not only something to get across the East River upon, but the sight of it will be a joy even to those who have no occasion to cross it." From the bridge's completion, the arch was highly used by vehicular traffic. Part of the colonnade's eastern arm was removed and replaced in the 1970s for the construction of the incomplete Second Avenue Subway. The arch and colonnade were designated a New York City landmark on November 25, 1975. After many years of neglect and several attempts by traffic engineers to remove the structure (including a proposal for the unbuilt Lower Manhattan Expressway that would have required removing the arch), the arch and colonnade were repaired and restored in 2000.

Pylons in Brooklyn 
The Brooklyn approach to the Manhattan Bridge also contained a terraced plaza with balustrades. Daniel Chester French designed two ,  pylons named "Brooklyn" and "Manhattan" on the Brooklyn side of the Manhattan Bridge. These were installed in November 1916. The pylons on the Brooklyn side were relocated to the Brooklyn Museum in 1963. The pylons never constituted a true portal, even when they were in place. Following their removal, the Brooklyn approach did not contain a formal entrance.

Subway tracks
Four subway tracks are located on the lower deck of the bridge, two on each side of the roadway. The two tracks on the south side are used by the Q train at all times and the N train at all times except late nights, when it uses the Montague Street Tunnel. The tracks on the north side are used by the D train at all times and the B train on weekdays. On the Manhattan side, the south side tracks connect to Canal Street and become the express tracks of the BMT Broadway Line, while the north side tracks connect to the Chrystie Street Connection through Grand Street and become the express tracks on the IND Sixth Avenue Line. On the Brooklyn side, the two pairs merge under Flatbush Avenue to a large junction with the BMT Fourth Avenue Line and BMT Brighton Line at DeKalb Avenue. For 18 years, between 1986 and 2004, one or the other set of tracks was closed to repair structural damage.

The feeder lines for the Brooklyn side of the tracks have not changed since subway service began on the bridge. It has always been fed by tracks from the BMT Fourth Avenue Line and the BMT Brighton Line, although the junction between the lines was reconstructed starting in 1956. On the Manhattan side, however, the two north tracks originally connected to the BMT Broadway Line (where the south tracks now connect) while the two south tracks curved south to join the BMT Nassau Street Line towards Chambers Street. As a result of the Chrystie Street Connection, which linked the north tracks to the Sixth Avenue Line upon completion in 1967, the Nassau Street connection was severed.

Trackage history

When the bridge first opened, its tracks did not connect to any others. In 1910, the Manhattan Bridge Three Cent Line, a streetcar company, began operations on those tracks. This was followed by the Brooklyn and North River Line in 1912. The trolley arrangement continued until 1915 when the subway tracks of the BRT (later BMT), which also had two tracks each over the Brooklyn and Williamsburg Bridges, was connected to the bridge. The trolleys were moved to the upper-level roadways until 1929, when service was discontinued. In the bridge's early years, the design was intended to contain four BRT subway tracks on the lower level, as well as two trolley and two elevated railway tracks on the upper level. The trolley tracks were carried around the Manhattan side's colonnade, while the subway tracks did not emerge from street level until south of the colonnade.

The subway tracks on the Manhattan Bridge opened on June 22, 1915, along with the Fourth Avenue Line and the Sea Beach Line to Coney Island–Stillwell Avenue station.  The north tracks carried Fourth Avenue and, later, Brighton trains that continued to Midtown Manhattan via the Broadway Line. The south tracks carried Sea Beach trains that terminated at Chambers Street, initially the only stop on the Manhattan side of the bridge. The Nassau Street Loop opened on May 29, 1931, extending the Nassau Street Line southward to the Montague Street Tunnel with two stations at Fulton Street and Broad Street. Service on that side decreased afterward. The only trains that normally crossed it were The Bankers’ Special, which ran from either the Sea Beach and/or Fourth Avenue Line, crossed the Manhattan Bridge or Montague Street Tunnel into Manhattan, and then returned to Brooklyn via the opposite crossing.

Since the tracks are on the outer part of the bridge, passing trains caused the structure to tilt and sway. The wobble worsened as train cars became longer and heavier. Eventually, when one train moved over the bridge one side would be three feet lower than the other side, severely damaging the structure. In 1956, a repair program was begun at a cost of $30 million. Trains still crossed the bridge, but many times one of the tracks had to be closed with both routes using a single-track, which further restricted the number and size of the trains crossing. Concurrent with the completion of the Chrystie Street Connection (opened November 26, 1967) to connect to the north tracks, the south tracks were rerouted to the Broadway Line, while the Nassau Line was disconnected from the bridge. The connection and its related projects added express service on the IND Sixth Avenue Line. At the time, the B train continued to Brooklyn using the BMT West End Line, while the D and Q trains used the Brighton Line and the N used the BMT Sea Beach Line.

Even after the 1956 repairs, the New York City Department of Transportation failed to maintain the bridge properly, and a major repair program began in the 1980s (see also ). Changes to subway service patterns started in 1983. Because of the large scope of these repairs, there was limited train access to the bridge, reducing the number of trains that could cross the span. The north tracks, which had been more heavily used, were closed first in April 1986. This split B and D service into two sections: trains from the Bronx and upper Manhattan terminated at 34th Street–Herald Square station, thus suspending express service on Sixth Avenue, while trains from Brooklyn were rerouted to the BMT Broadway Line express via the south side of the bridge. The N was rerouted via the Montague Street Tunnel.

The north tracks were reopened and the south tracks were closed simultaneously in December 1988, merging the B and D services, rerouting the Q train to Sixth Avenue in Manhattan. Broadway Line express service was suspended while Sixth Avenue express service was restored. After an 18-month delay for procuring contracts, the New York City Transit Authority and politicians pressured the DOT to resume N train service on the bridge's south side on September 30, 1990, despite warnings from engineers that the structure was unsafe and major repairs still had to be made. On December 27, state inspectors forced south side service to be rerouted via the tunnel again after discovery of corroded support beams and missing steel plates. The city's deputy commissioner for bridges and his administrative assistant were fired after this incident. Following the controversial decision to do so, the New York City Council's Transportation committee held an inquiry into the decision to restore subway service on the Manhattan Bridge's south side, as well as an inquiry into the safety of all New York City bridges. They found that the Transportation Department and Transit Authority's lack of cooperative inspection were a major contributor for the deteriorating conditions.

A projection for a reopening date was initially made for 1995. That year, the north side was closed during off-peak hours for six months, rerouting the Q to Broadway and cutting D service from Brooklyn and B service from Manhattan. The south side finally reopened on July 22, 2001, whereby the north side was again closed, returning the Q to the express tracks on the Broadway Line; introducing the new  train to run on the West End Line; and  cutting B and D service from Brooklyn. The south side was closed on weekends from April to November 2003, and the Q was rerouted via the Montague Street Tunnel. On February 22, 2004, the north side reopened, and all four tracks were in service simultaneously for the first time in 18 years. B and D trains returned to Brooklyn, but switched routes in that borough (the B on the Brighton Line and D on the Fourth Avenue and West End Lines). Additionally, daytime N trains once again used the bridge for travel and the W train service in Brooklyn was discontinued.

Between August 2, 2013, and September 14, 2014, weekend R trains and late-night N trains also used the south tracks due to the Montague Street Tunnel being closed for Hurricane Sandy-related repairs.

Tracks used

1967–1986

1986–1988: North tracks closed

1988–2001: South tracks closed

2001–2004: North tracks closed

2013–2014: Montague Street Tunnel closed

2004–2013: 2014–Present

Exits and entrances
Access to the Manhattan Bridge is provided by a series of ramps on both the Manhattan and Brooklyn sides of the river.

Proposed I-478 designation
In 1958, the I-478 route number was proposed for the Lower Manhattan Expressway branch along the Manhattan Bridge. This highway would have run between I-78 (which would have split to another branch that used the Williamsburg Bridge) and I-278. The Lower Manhattan Expressway project was canceled in March 1971, so the spur neither qualified to be part of the Interstate Highway System nor connected to any existing highways (though ramps directly from I-278 (Brooklyn-Queens Expressway) are accessible on the Brooklyn side). A fragment of the never-built expressway's onramp still exists above the Manhattan side of the bridge's center roadway.

Gallery

See also

 List of bridges and tunnels in New York City
 List of New York City Designated Landmarks in Manhattan below 14th Street
 National Register of Historic Places listings in Brooklyn
 National Register of Historic Places listings in Manhattan below 14th Street

References

Citations

Sources

External links

 
 Manhattan Bridge at New York City DOT
 Manhattan Bridge  at NYCsubway.org

Bike paths in New York City
Bridges completed in 1909
Bridges in Brooklyn
Bridges in Manhattan
Bridges on the National Register of Historic Places in New York City
Bridges over the East River
Brooklyn–Manhattan Transit Corporation
Buildings and structures on the National Register of Historic Places in Manhattan
Double-decker bridges
Historic American Engineering Record in New York City
Historic Civil Engineering Landmarks
Interstate 78
National Register of Historic Places in Brooklyn
New York City Designated Landmarks in Manhattan
Pedestrian bridges in New York City
Railroad bridges in New York City
Railroad bridges on the National Register of Historic Places in New York City
Rapid transit bridges
Road bridges in New York City
Road bridges on the National Register of Historic Places in New York City
Road-rail bridges in the United States
Steel bridges in the United States
Suspension bridges in New York City
Warren truss bridges in the United States
Dumbo, Brooklyn